Archie Hughes (2 February 1919 – 11 March 1992) was a Welsh professional footballer, who played as a goalkeeper for Huddersfield Town, Tottenham Hotspur, Blackburn Rovers, Nelson, Rochdale and Crystal Palace. He also won five caps for the Wales national football team.

References

External links

1919 births
1992 deaths
People from Colwyn Bay
Sportspeople from Conwy County Borough
Association football goalkeepers
Welsh footballers
Newry City F.C. players
Huddersfield Town A.F.C. players
Tottenham Hotspur F.C. players
Blackburn Rovers F.C. players
Nelson F.C. players
Rochdale A.F.C. players
Crystal Palace F.C. players
Canterbury City F.C. players
Wales international footballers
English Football League players